Capital punishment is a legal penalty in the U.S. state of Florida.

Since 1976, the state has executed 100 convicted murderers, all at Florida State Prison. As of March 18, 2023, 299 offenders are awaiting execution.

History 

Florida performed its last pre-Furman execution in 1964. After the Supreme Court of the United States struck down all states' death penalty procedures in Furman v. Georgia (1972), essentially ruling the imposition of the death penalty at the same time as a guilty verdict unconstitutional, Florida was the first state to draft a newly written statute on August 12, 1972. After the Supreme Court permitted the death penalty once more in Gregg v. Georgia (1976), the state electrocuted John Arthur Spenkelink on May 25, 1979, which was the second execution in the U.S. since 1967, after that of Gary Gilmore on January 17, 1977, in Utah.

Capital crimes 
In Florida, murder can be punished by death if it involves one of the next aggravating factors:
It was committed by a person previously convicted of a felony and under sentence of imprisonment, placed on community control, or on felony probation.
The defendant was previously convicted of another capital felony or of a felony involving the use or threat of violence to the person.
The defendant knowingly created a great risk of death to many persons.
It was committed while the defendant was engaged, or was an accomplice, in the commission of, or an attempt to commit a specified felony (such as aggravated child abuse, arson, kidnapping, placing or discharging of a destructive device or bomb).
It was committed for the purpose of avoiding or preventing a lawful arrest or effecting an escape from custody.
It was committed for pecuniary [financial] gain.
It was committed to disrupt or hinder the lawful exercise of any governmental function or the enforcement of laws.
It was especially heinous, atrocious, or cruel.
It was committed in a cold, calculated, and premeditated manner without any pretense of moral or legal justification.
The victim was a law enforcement officer engaged in the performance of his or her official duties.
The victim was an elected or appointed public official engaged in the performance of his or her official duties if the motive for the capital felony was related, in whole or in part, to the victim’s official capacity.
The victim was a person less than 12 years of age.
The victim was particularly vulnerable due to advanced age or disability, or because the defendant stood in a position of familial or custodial authority over the victim.
It was committed by a criminal gang member.
It was committed by a person currently or formerly designated as a sexual predator.
It was committed by a person subject to a restrictive order or a foreign protection order, and was committed against the person who obtained the injunction or protection order or any spouse, child, sibling, or parent of this person.

Florida statute also provides the death penalty for capital drug trafficking and discharging or using a destructive device causing death. A provision for capital sexual battery was found unconstitutional in the 2008 U.S. Supreme Court case Kennedy v. Louisiana. No one is on death row in the United States for drug trafficking.

Legal process

Trial 
In Hurst v. Florida (2014), the United States Supreme Court struck down part of Florida's death penalty law, holding it was not sufficient for a judge to determine the aggravating facts to be used in considering a death sentence. The court ruled that this trial process violated the Sixth Amendment right to jury trial under Ring v. Arizona (2002). This was later held to benefit only to defendants sentenced by a non-unanimous jury from 2002 to 2014.

Sentencing 

Since March 2017, when the prosecution pursues the death penalty, the sentence is decided by the jury and must be unanimous. 

In case of a hung jury during the penalty phase of the trial, a life sentence is issued, even if a single juror opposed death (there is no retrial).

Prior to 2014, the judge decided the sentence alone, and the jury gave only a non-binding advice. In March 2014, the Florida Legislature provided a 10-juror supermajority to issue a sentence of death. This was also challenged and in October 2014, the Florida Supreme Court struck down the law, finding that death sentences can only be handed down by a unanimous jury.

Appeals 
On June 14, 2013, Governor Rick Scott signed the Timely Justice Act of 2013. The law is designed to overhaul and speed up the process of capital punishment. It creates tighter time frames for a person sentenced to death to make appeals and post-conviction motions and imposes reporting requirements on case progress.

Executions 

Death sentences are carried out via lethal injection. 
However, the sentence can be carried out by electrocution if the offender requests it. If lethal injection or electrocution is held unconstitutional, statutes authorize the use of "any constitutional method of execution" instead.

The only execution chamber in Florida is located at Florida State Prison in Starke. When sentenced, male convicts who receive the death penalty are incarcerated at either Florida State Prison itself, or at Union Correctional Institution next door to Florida State Prison, while female convicts who are sentenced to death are incarcerated at Lowell Correctional Institution north of Ocala. Inmates are moved to the death row at Florida State Prison when their death warrant is signed.

Florida used public hanging under a local jurisdiction, overseen and performed by the sheriffs of the counties where the crimes took place. However, in 1923, the Florida Legislature passed a law replacing hanging with the electric chair and stated that all future execution will be performed under state jurisdiction inside prisons. The electric chair became a subject of strong controversy in the 1990s after three executions received considerable media attention and were labeled as "botched" by opponents (Jesse Tafero in 1990, Pedro Medina in 1997, and Allen Lee Davis in 1999). While most states switched to the lethal injection, many politicians in Florida opposed giving up "Old Sparky", seeing it as a "deterrent". Finally, after the Davis execution, lethal injection was enabled as the default method.

Clemency 
The Governor of Florida has the right to commute the death penalty, but only with positive recommendation of clemency from a Board, where they sit.

Between 1925 and 1965, 57 commutations were granted out of 268 cases.  Since 1972, when the death penalty was re-instituted, only six commutations have been granted, all under the administration of Governor Bob Graham.

See also 
 Capital punishment in the United States
 List of people executed in Florida
 List of death row inmates in Florida
 Crime in Florida
 Law of Florida

References

External links 

 Florida execution chamber photo
 Florida Capital Cases website

 
1972 establishments in Florida
Executions
Florida
Florida law